Trae Elston (born February 16, 1994) is an American football safety for the New Jersey Generals of the United States Football League (USFL). He played college football at Mississippi. Elston was a member of the 2017 Superbowl winning Philadelphia Eagles.

Professional career

New Orleans Saints
Elston was signed by the New Orleans Saints as an undrafted free agent on May 2, 2016. He was released on September 3, 2016.

Tampa Bay Buccaneers
Elston was signed to the Buccaneers' practice squad on October 17, 2016. He was released on November 15, 2016.

Cleveland Browns
On December 7, 2016 Elston was signed to the Cleveland Browns' active roster. He was waived on December 21, 2016 and was re-signed to the practice squad. He signed a reserve/future contract with the Browns on January 2, 2017.

On April 20, 2017, Elston was waived by the Browns.

Buffalo Bills
On April 21, 2017, Elston was claimed off waivers by the Buffalo Bills. He was waived on September 19, 2017.

Philadelphia Eagles 
On September 20, 2017, Elston was claimed off waivers by the Philadelphia Eagles. He was waived by the Eagles on September 30, 2017.

Buffalo Bills (second stint)
On October 3, 2017, Elston was signed by the Bills.

Elston made his first career NFL start against the Oakland Raiders on October 29, 2017. In that game, Elston recorded his first career interception by picking off Raiders quarterback Derek Carr late in the 4th quarter and led all defensive players with a career high 11 tackles (8 solo). The Bills won the game 34-14. On December 28, 2017, Elston was waived by the Bills.

Miami Dolphins
On December 29, 2017, Elston was claimed off waivers by the Miami Dolphins. He was waived on September 1, 2018.

Philadelphia Eagles (second stint)
On June 5, 2019, Elston signed with the Philadelphia Eagles. He was waived during final roster cuts on August 30, 2019.

New Orleans Saints (second stint)
On October 23, 2019, Elston was signed to the New Orleans Saints practice squad. He was released on November 20, 2019.

Houston Roughnecks
Elston was drafted in the third round during phase four in the 2020 XFL Draft by the Houston Roughnecks. He was placed on injured reserve on January 30, 2020. He had his contract terminated when the league suspended operations on April 10, 2020.

Calgary Stampeders
Elston signed with the Calgary Stampeders of the CFL on January 25, 2021.

New Jersey Generals
Elston was selected in the 9th round of the 2022 USFL Draft by the New Jersey Generals. He was transferred to the team's practice squad on April 14, 2022, and moved to the active roster on April 16. He was ruled inactive for the team's game against the New Orleans Breakers on May 14. He was transferred back to the active roster on May 20.

References

External links 
Ole Miss Rebels bio
Tampa Bay Buccaneers bio
Cleveland Browns bio

1994 births
Living people
American football safeties
Buffalo Bills players
Cleveland Browns players
Ole Miss Rebels football players
Miami Dolphins players
New Orleans Saints players
People from Oxford, Alabama
Philadelphia Eagles players
Players of American football from Alabama
Tampa Bay Buccaneers players
Houston Roughnecks players
Calgary Stampeders players
New Jersey Generals (2022) players